Lamellitrochus carinatus is a species of sea snail, a marine gastropod mollusk in the family Solariellidae.

Distribution
The species is found primarily in the Gulf of Mexico.

Description 
The maximum recorded shell length is 2.9 mm. at depths between 60 m and 200 m.

Habitat 
Minimum recorded depth is 60 m. Maximum recorded depth is 200 m.

References

 Quinn, J. F., Jr. 1991. Lamellitrochus, a new genus of Solariellinae (Gastropoda: Trochidae), with descriptions of six new species from the Western Atlantic Ocean. Nautilus 105: 81–91

External links

carinatus
Gastropods described in 1991